Larry Joseph Stallings (born December 11, 1941) is a former professional American football player who played in 14 NFL seasons from 1963 to 1976 for the St. Louis Cardinals.

Stallings was a one-time Pro Bowl selection for the Cardinals in 1970.

1941 births
Living people
American football linebackers
St. Louis Cardinals (football) players
National Conference Pro Bowl players
Georgia Tech Yellow Jackets football players
Sportspeople from Evansville, Indiana